The 1910 VFL season was the 14th season of the Victorian Football League (VFL), the highest level senior Australian rules football competition in Victoria. The season featured ten clubs, ran from 30 April until 1 October, and comprised an 18-game home-and-away season followed by a finals series featuring the top four clubs.

The premiership was won by the Collingwood Football Club for the third time, after it defeated  by 14 points in the 1910 VFL Grand Final.

Premiership season
In 1910, the VFL competition comprised ten teams of 18 on-the-field players each, with no "reserves", although any of the 18 players who had left the playing field for any reason could later resume their place on the field at any time during the match.

Each team played each other twice in a home-and-away season of 18 rounds.

Once the 18 round home-and-away season had finished, the 1910 VFL Premiers were determined by the specific format and conventions of the amended "Argus system".

Round 1

|- bgcolor="#CCCCFF"
| Home team
| Home team score
| Away team
| Away team score
| Venue
| Date
|- bgcolor="#FFFFFF"
| 
| 3.12 (30)
| 
| 7.10 (52)
| Junction Oval
| 30 April 1910
|- bgcolor="#FFFFFF"
| 
| 3.18 (36)
| 
| 9.10 (64)
| EMCG
| 30 April 1910
|- bgcolor="#FFFFFF"
| 
| 9.9 (63)
| 
| 5.5 (35)
| Princes Park
| 30 April 1910
|- bgcolor="#FFFFFF"
| 
| 11.12 (78)
| 
| 4.8 (32)
| Lake Oval
| 30 April 1910
|- bgcolor="#FFFFFF"
| 
| 6.6 (42)
| 
| 13.21 (99)
| MCG
| 30 April 1910

Round 2

|- bgcolor="#CCCCFF"
| Home team
| Home team score
| Away team
| Away team score
| Venue
| Date
|- bgcolor="#FFFFFF"
| 
| 14.15 (99)
| 
| 4.12 (36)
| Brunswick Street Oval
| 14 May 1910
|- bgcolor="#FFFFFF"
| 
| 13.9 (87)
| 
| 5.16 (46)
| Victoria Park
| 14 May 1910
|- bgcolor="#FFFFFF"
| 
| 16.18 (114)
| 
| 5.7 (37)
| Punt Road Oval
| 14 May 1910
|- bgcolor="#FFFFFF"
| 
| 8.10 (58)
| 
| 15.17 (107)
| EMCG
| 14 May 1910
|- bgcolor="#FFFFFF"
| 
| 6.9 (45)
| 
| 10.15 (75)
| Corio Oval
| 14 May 1910

Round 3

|- bgcolor="#CCCCFF"
| Home team
| Home team score
| Away team
| Away team score
| Venue
| Date
|- bgcolor="#FFFFFF"
| 
| 7.11 (53)
| 
| 9.13 (67)
| Brunswick Street Oval
| 21 May 1910
|- bgcolor="#FFFFFF"
| 
| 13.13 (91)
| 
| 2.6 (18)
| Victoria Park
| 21 May 1910
|- bgcolor="#FFFFFF"
| 
| 10.13 (73)
| 
| 7.10 (52)
| EMCG
| 21 May 1910
|- bgcolor="#FFFFFF"
| 
| 10.7 (67)
| 
| 11.7 (73)
| Lake Oval
| 21 May 1910
|- bgcolor="#FFFFFF"
| 
| 5.6 (36)
| 
| 9.15 (69)
| MCG
| 21 May 1910

Round 4

|- bgcolor="#CCCCFF"
| Home team
| Home team score
| Away team
| Away team score
| Venue
| Date
|- bgcolor="#FFFFFF"
| 
| 6.9 (45)
| 
| 9.4 (58)
| Corio Oval
| 28 May 1910
|- bgcolor="#FFFFFF"
| 
| 6.13 (49)
| 
| 4.8 (32)
| Princes Park
| 28 May 1910
|- bgcolor="#FFFFFF"
| 
| 7.9 (51)
| 
| 8.6 (54)
| Junction Oval
| 28 May 1910
|- bgcolor="#FFFFFF"
| 
| 7.19 (61)
| 
| 4.8 (32)
| Punt Road Oval
| 28 May 1910
|- bgcolor="#FFFFFF"
| 
| 6.7 (43)
| 
| 4.17 (41)
| EMCG
| 28 May 1910

Round 5

|- bgcolor="#CCCCFF"
| Home team
| Home team score
| Away team
| Away team score
| Venue
| Date
|- bgcolor="#FFFFFF"
| 
| 6.14 (50)
| 
| 7.6 (48)
| Lake Oval
| 4 June 1910
|- bgcolor="#FFFFFF"
| 
| 5.16 (46)
| 
| 4.5 (29)
| Corio Oval
| 4 June 1910
|- bgcolor="#FFFFFF"
| 
| 8.15 (63)
| 
| 7.9 (51)
| EMCG
| 4 June 1910
|- bgcolor="#FFFFFF"
| 
| 10.16 (76)
| 
| 4.4 (28)
| Victoria Park
| 4 June 1910
|- bgcolor="#FFFFFF"
| 
| 9.9 (63)
| 
| 14.20 (104)
| Brunswick Street Oval
| 4 June 1910

Round 6

|- bgcolor="#CCCCFF"
| Home team
| Home team score
| Away team
| Away team score
| Venue
| Date
|- bgcolor="#FFFFFF"
| 
| 11.12 (78)
| 
| 6.6 (42)
| Corio Oval
| 6 June 1910
|- bgcolor="#FFFFFF"
| 
| 7.7 (49)
| 
| 8.14 (62)
| Junction Oval
| 6 June 1910
|- bgcolor="#FFFFFF"
| 
| 10.7 (67)
| 
| 16.21 (117)
| MCG
| 6 June 1910
|- bgcolor="#FFFFFF"
| 
| 7.9 (51)
| 
| 11.14 (80)
| Brunswick Street Oval
| 6 June 1910
|- bgcolor="#FFFFFF"
| 
| 5.5 (35)
| 
| 11.8 (74)
| EMCG
| 6 June 1910

Round 7

|- bgcolor="#CCCCFF"
| Home team
| Home team score
| Away team
| Away team score
| Venue
| Date
|- bgcolor="#FFFFFF"
| 
| 6.15 (51)
| 
| 7.10 (52)
| Princes Park
| 11 June 1910
|- bgcolor="#FFFFFF"
| 
| 11.15 (81)
| 
| 6.10 (46)
| Lake Oval
| 11 June 1910
|- bgcolor="#FFFFFF"
| 
| 9.6 (60)
| 
| 10.14 (74)
| Junction Oval
| 11 June 1910
|- bgcolor="#FFFFFF"
| 
| 13.14 (92)
| 
| 8.8 (56)
| EMCG
| 11 June 1910
|- bgcolor="#FFFFFF"
| 
| 5.7 (37)
| 
| 6.9 (45)
| Punt Road Oval
| 11 June 1910

Round 8

|- bgcolor="#CCCCFF"
| Home team
| Home team score
| Away team
| Away team score
| Venue
| Date
|- bgcolor="#FFFFFF"
| 
| 4.5 (29)
| 
| 6.13 (49)
| Junction Oval
| 18 June 1910
|- bgcolor="#FFFFFF"
| 
| 5.12 (42)
| 
| 2.9 (21)
| EMCG
| 18 June 1910
|- bgcolor="#FFFFFF"
| 
| 6.10 (46)
| 
| 6.6 (42)
| Victoria Park
| 18 June 1910
|- bgcolor="#FFFFFF"
| 
| 6.14 (50)
| 
| 8.18 (66)
| MCG
| 18 June 1910
|- bgcolor="#FFFFFF"
| 
| 7.6 (48)
| 
| 7.15 (57)
| Punt Road Oval
| 18 June 1910

Round 9

|- bgcolor="#CCCCFF"
| Home team
| Home team score
| Away team
| Away team score
| Venue
| Date
|- bgcolor="#FFFFFF"
| 
| 7.13 (55)
| 
| 11.6 (72)
| Brunswick Street Oval
| 25 June 1910
|- bgcolor="#FFFFFF"
| 
| 9.10 (64)
| 
| 4.7 (31)
| Princes Park
| 25 June 1910
|- bgcolor="#FFFFFF"
| 
| 7.7 (49)
| 
| 4.11 (35)
| EMCG
| 25 June 1910
|- bgcolor="#FFFFFF"
| 
| 6.10 (46)
| 
| 9.14 (68)
| Punt Road Oval
| 25 June 1910
|- bgcolor="#FFFFFF"
| 
| 10.9 (69)
| 
| 6.11 (47)
| Corio Oval
| 25 June 1910

Round 10

|- bgcolor="#CCCCFF"
| Home team
| Home team score
| Away team
| Away team score
| Venue
| Date
|- bgcolor="#FFFFFF"
| 
| 10.7 (67)
| 
| 10.11 (71)
| Punt Road Oval
| 2 July 1910
|- bgcolor="#FFFFFF"
| 
| 15.10 (100)
| 
| 8.3 (51)
| Corio Oval
| 2 July 1910
|- bgcolor="#FFFFFF"
| 
| 7.12 (54)
| 
| 6.9 (45)
| EMCG
| 2 July 1910
|- bgcolor="#FFFFFF"
| 
| 11.5 (71)
| 
| 12.17 (89)
| Brunswick Street Oval
| 2 July 1910
|- bgcolor="#FFFFFF"
| 
| 2.10 (22)
| 
| 6.15 (51)
| Victoria Park
| 2 July 1910

Round 11

|- bgcolor="#CCCCFF"
| Home team
| Home team score
| Away team
| Away team score
| Venue
| Date
|- bgcolor="#FFFFFF"
| 
| 4.10 (34)
| 
| 12.15 (87)
| MCG
| 9 July 1910
|- bgcolor="#FFFFFF"
| 
| 8.9 (57)
| 
| 11.9 (75)
| EMCG
| 9 July 1910
|- bgcolor="#FFFFFF"
| 
| 16.11 (107)
| 
| 3.15 (33)
| Princes Park
| 9 July 1910
|- bgcolor="#FFFFFF"
| 
| 4.10 (34)
| 
| 8.14 (62)
| Junction Oval
| 9 July 1910
|- bgcolor="#FFFFFF"
| 
| 13.17 (95)
| 
| 4.9 (33)
| Lake Oval
| 9 July 1910

Round 12

|- bgcolor="#CCCCFF"
| Home team
| Home team score
| Away team
| Away team score
| Venue
| Date
|- bgcolor="#FFFFFF"
| 
| 5.11 (41)
| 
| 10.7 (67)
| Punt Road Oval
| 16 July 1910
|- bgcolor="#FFFFFF"
| 
| 6.9 (45)
| 
| 5.4 (34)
| EMCG
| 16 July 1910
|- bgcolor="#FFFFFF"
| 
| 13.22 (100)
| 
| 4.11 (35)
| Princes Park
| 16 July 1910
|- bgcolor="#FFFFFF"
| 
| 11.6 (72)
| 
| 4.9 (33)
| Corio Oval
| 16 July 1910
|- bgcolor="#FFFFFF"
| 
| 6.8 (44)
| 
| 7.12 (54)
| Junction Oval
| 16 July 1910

Round 13

|- bgcolor="#CCCCFF"
| Home team
| Home team score
| Away team
| Away team score
| Venue
| Date
|- bgcolor="#FFFFFF"
| 
| 6.12 (48)
| 
| 4.11 (35)
| MCG
| 23 July 1910
|- bgcolor="#FFFFFF"
| 
| 3.7 (25)
| 
| 5.5 (35)
| Brunswick Street Oval
| 23 July 1910
|- bgcolor="#FFFFFF"
| 
| 5.13 (43)
| 
| 2.9 (21)
| Victoria Park
| 23 July 1910
|- bgcolor="#FFFFFF"
| 
| 8.13 (61)
| 
| 5.8 (38)
| EMCG
| 23 July 1910
|- bgcolor="#FFFFFF"
| 
| 4.7 (31)
| 
| 6.8 (44)
| Lake Oval
| 23 July 1910

Round 14

|- bgcolor="#CCCCFF"
| Home team
| Home team score
| Away team
| Away team score
| Venue
| Date
|- bgcolor="#FFFFFF"
| 
| 5.13 (43)
| 
| 4.16 (40)
| Princes Park
| 30 July 1910
|- bgcolor="#FFFFFF"
| 
| 3.6 (24)
| 
| 10.7 (67)
| EMCG
| 30 July 1910
|- bgcolor="#FFFFFF"
| 
| 5.12 (42)
| 
| 6.6 (42)
| Punt Road Oval
| 30 July 1910
|- bgcolor="#FFFFFF"
| 
| 5.8 (38)
| 
| 11.11 (77)
| Junction Oval
| 30 July 1910
|- bgcolor="#FFFFFF"
| 
| 7.6 (48)
| 
| 9.12 (66)
| MCG
| 30 July 1910

Round 15

|- bgcolor="#CCCCFF"
| Home team
| Home team score
| Away team
| Away team score
| Venue
| Date
|- bgcolor="#FFFFFF"
| 
| 8.6 (54)
| 
| 1.10 (16)
| Punt Road Oval
| 6 August 1910
|- bgcolor="#FFFFFF"
| 
| 7.12 (54)
| 
| 6.6 (42)
| Victoria Park
| 6 August 1910
|- bgcolor="#FFFFFF"
| 
| 11.12 (78)
| 
| 3.8 (26)
| Lake Oval
| 6 August 1910
|- bgcolor="#FFFFFF"
| 
| 4.18 (42)
| 
| 7.12 (54)
| EMCG
| 13 August 1910
|- bgcolor="#FFFFFF"
| 
| 11.12 (78)
| 
| 6.14 (50)
| Princes Park
| 13 August 1910

Round 16

|- bgcolor="#CCCCFF"
| Home team
| Home team score
| Away team
| Away team score
| Venue
| Date
|- bgcolor="#FFFFFF"
| 
| 8.6 (54)
| 
| 8.10 (58)
| MCG
| 20 August 1910
|- bgcolor="#FFFFFF"
| 
| 7.11 (53)
| 
| 3.6 (24)
| Corio Oval
| 20 August 1910
|- bgcolor="#FFFFFF"
| 
| 3.5 (23)
| 
| 7.6 (48)
| Brunswick Street Oval
| 20 August 1910
|- bgcolor="#FFFFFF"
| 
| 8.13 (61)
| 
| 5.4 (34)
| Victoria Park
| 20 August 1910
|- bgcolor="#FFFFFF"
| 
| 8.12 (60)
| 
| 7.10 (52)
| EMCG
| 20 August 1910

Round 17

|- bgcolor="#CCCCFF"
| Home team
| Home team score
| Away team
| Away team score
| Venue
| Date
|- bgcolor="#FFFFFF"
| 
| 12.16 (88)
| 
| 2.11 (23)
| Brunswick Street Oval
| 27 August 1910
|- bgcolor="#FFFFFF"
| 
| 9.8 (62)
| 
| 6.9 (45)
| Princes Park
| 27 August 1910
|- bgcolor="#FFFFFF"
| 
| 11.11 (77)
| 
| 10.5 (65)
| Lake Oval
| 27 August 1910
|- bgcolor="#FFFFFF"
| 
| 10.19 (79)
| 
| 10.11 (71)
| Corio Oval
| 27 August 1910
|- bgcolor="#FFFFFF"
| 
| 9.5 (59)
| 
| 10.15 (75)
| EMCG
| 27 August 1910

Round 18

|- bgcolor="#CCCCFF"
| Home team
| Home team score
| Away team
| Away team score
| Venue
| Date
|- bgcolor="#FFFFFF"
| 
| 9.6 (60)
| 
| 7.7 (49)
| MCG
| 3 September 1910
|- bgcolor="#FFFFFF"
| 
| 6.14 (50)
| 
| 7.9 (51)
| EMCG
| 3 September 1910
|- bgcolor="#FFFFFF"
| 
| 4.13 (37)
| 
| 2.9 (21)
| Victoria Park
| 3 September 1910
|- bgcolor="#FFFFFF"
| 
| 7.10 (52)
| 
| 4.5 (29)
| Lake Oval
| 3 September 1910
|- bgcolor="#FFFFFF"
| 
| 5.6 (36)
| 
| 2.12 (24)
| Junction Oval
| 3 September 1910

Ladder

Finals

All of the 1910 finals were played at the MCG so the home team in the semi-finals and Preliminary Final is purely the higher ranked team from the ladder but in the Grand Final the home team was the team that won the Preliminary Final.

Semi-finals

|- bgcolor="#CCCCFF"
| Home team
| Score
| Away team
| Score
| Venue
| Date
|- bgcolor="#FFFFFF"
| Collingwood
| 14.11 (95)
| Essendon
| 5.7 (37)
| MCG
| 10 September
|- bgcolor="#FFFFFF"
| Carlton
| 6.17 (53)
| South Melbourne
| 10.5 (65)| MCG
| 17 September

Preliminary final

|- bgcolor="#CCCCFF"
| Home team| Score| Away team| Score| Venue| Date|- bgcolor="#FFFFFF"
| Collingwood'| 8.7 (55)
| South Melbourne
| 6.8 (44)
| MCG
| 24 September

Grand final

Collingwood defeated Carlton 9.7 (61) to 6.11 (47), in front of a crowd of 42,577 people. (For an explanation of scoring see Australian rules football).

Awards
 The 1910 VFL Premiership team was Collingwood.
 The VFL's leading goalkicker was Percy Martini of Geelong with 51 goals.
 St Kilda, took the "wooden spoon" in 1910.

Notable events
 Former Carlton coach Jack Worrall was appointed umpires' coach, with a view to raising standards and decreasing violence.
 Round 2, originally scheduled for 7 May, was postponed by one week, and remaining rounds pushed back by one week, due to the death of Edward VII on 6 May.
 In the last quarter of the round 4 match between Carlton and South Melbourne, Carlton's George Topping king-hit South Melbourne's Bert Streckfuss behind the play, causing spectators to jump the fence and participate in an all-in melee with players and officials. Topping was suspended for the remainder of 1910 and all of 1911 as a result of the incident.
 Field umpire A. Noseda awarded 100 free kicks in a single match (round 8 match between South Melbourne and St Kilda).
 VFL conducted an inquiry into allegations that particular players from Carlton, Fitzroy, Melbourne, and South Melbourne had been paid to play "dead". In particular, Carlton's Doug Gillespie, Alex "Bongo" Lang, and Doug Fraser were investigated (the inquiry dealt with Lang and Fraser behind closed doors). Gillespie was exonerated, while Lang and Fraser were each suspended for five years.
 St Kilda, after losing its first seventeen games, defeated minor premier Carlton in a major upset in the last round to avoid its expected fifth winless season.
 Carlton player and Secretary Arthur Charles "Shooter" Ford was charged with abusing and physically threatening the field umpire (off the field) after Carlton's round 14 match against Fitzroy; Ford was suspended for 12 months and debarred from his role as Club Secretary. There was speculation that the issue between the two was connected with the suspension of George Topping earlier in the season.
 T.W Sherrin manufactured special footballs for the Premiership Finals.

References

External links
 1910 Season – AFL Tables
 Player payments and the great bribery scandal

Australian Football League seasons
VFL season